The Singapore Exchange Limited (SGX) is a Singaporean investment holding company that provides different services related to securities and derivatives trading and others. SGX is also a member of the World Federation of Exchanges and the Asian and Oceanian Stock Exchanges Federation.

Structure 
SGX operates several different divisions, each responsible for handling specific businesses.
 SGX ETS (Electronic Trading System): provides global trading access to SGX markets where 80 percent of the customers are from outside Singapore.
 SGX DT (Derivatives Trading): provides derivatives trading.
 SGX ST (Securities Trading): provides securities trading.
 SGX DC (Derivatives Clearing): subsidiary for clearing and settlement operations.
 SGX AsiaClear: offers clearing services for over-the-counter (OTC) oil swaps and forward freight agreements.
 SGX Reach: an electronic trading platform.
 Central Depository Pte Ltd: subsidiary responsible for securities clearing, settlement and depository services.
 Asian Gateway Investments Pte Ltd: wholly owned subsidiary 
 Singapore Exchange IT Solutions Pte Ltd: provides computer services and maintenance as well as software maintenance

Listing 
The companies listed on SGX belong to one of two groups: the companies listed on the SGX Mainboard and the companies listed on SGX NASDAQ. In order to be listed on the mainboard, a company has to fulfill some requirements set forth by SGX, while a listing on NASDAQ is not tied to the fulfillment of any additional conditions. SESDAQ was replaced on 26 November 2007 by the SGX Catalist after an extensive study of other market models and a public consultation in May 2007. The word "Catalist" is an amalgamation of the words "Catalyst" and "List", to reflect the idea that the Catalist board could be used as a catalyst to propel growth upon listing. Catalist differs from SESDAQ primarily in its use of a sponsor system to determine a prospective company's suitability to list and as a corporate advisor to advise on listing and corporate governance issues.

Trading system 
The exchange launched SGX QUEST (SGX Quotation and Execution System) in August 2004. The system is used by the exchange for derivatives and securities trading.

Trading hours 

Local times:

History

Formation of SGX 
SGX was formed on 1 December 1999 as a holding company. The share capital of some former exchange companies, namely Stock Exchange of Singapore (SES), Singapore International Monetary Exchange (SIMEX) that was founded in 1984 and  Securities Clearing and Computer Services Pte Ltd (SCCS) was cancelled and new shares issued in these companies were fully paid up by SGX. In this way, all assets previously owned by these three companies were transferred to SGX. The shareholders previously holding shares in SES, SIMEX and SCCS received newly issued SGX shares.

Third Listed Exchange in Asia-Pacific 
On 23 November 2000, SGX became the third exchange in Asia-Pacific to be listed via a public offer and a private placement after Australian Securities Exchange; which listed in 1998 and Hong Kong Stock Exchange earlier in 2000. Listed on its own bourse, the SGX stock is a component of benchmark indices such as the MSCI Singapore Free Index and the Straits Times Index.

Joint Venture 
On 25 September 2006, the Joint Asian Derivatives Exchange (JADE), a joint venture between SGX and Chicago Board of Trade (CBOT) became operational. However, this joint venture was cancelled in November 2007, with CME Groups selling of its 50% stake in the joint venture to SGX. The contracts previously traded on JADE were transferred to SGX's QUEST trading platform.

In August 2009, SGX formed a joint venture with Chi-X Global, called Chi-East. At the beginning of October 2010, this joint venture received approval from the Monetary Authority of Singapore to operate a dark pool trading platform.

Acquisition 
In March 2007, SGX bought a 5% stake in Bombay Stock Exchange for 42.7 million dollars.

On 15 June 2007,  Tokyo Stock Exchange, Inc. announced that it had acquired a 4.99% stake in SGX. Since then the value of the shares has declined and the Tokyo Stock Exchange, Inc. has made a decision to sell the shares it holds in SGX to its parent company, the Tokyo Stock Exchange Group, Inc.

On 31 January 2008, SGX acquired a 20% stake in  Philippine Dealing System Holdings Corp, which has become an associated company of SGX.

At the beginning of 2008, SGX reached an agreement to buy at least 95% of Singapore Commodity Exchange.  On 30 June 2008, SGX completed the acquisition of Singapore Commodity Exchange Ltd (SICOM), which now is a 100% subsidiary.

In November 2016 the Singapore Exchange (SGX) acquired the Baltic Exchange, headquartered in London.

Representative Office 
On 18 April 2008, SGX opened a representative office in Beijing.

On 8 June 2010, SGX announced it has opened an office in London. This is part of SGXs move to invest S$250 million into its Reach initiative. By implementing this initiative, SGX plans to create the world's fastest trading engine and a data centre as well as further connecting trading communities in the world to Singapore. The new trading platform, SGX Reach, will be delivered to SGX by  NASDAQ OMX, Voltaire and  HP. This platform is based on GENIUM, a trading platform developed by NASDAQ OMX.

Partnership 
SGX has entered a partnership with NASDAQ OMX. Together they will provide a suite of tools and solutions for companies, which is designed to support listed companies in Asia.

Dual currency trading 
SGX plan to introduce dual currency trading of securities — Which includes stocks, bonds and other listed investments in two different denominations, the Singapore and US dollar on 2 April 2012.

Financial Performance 
As of 31 January 2010, SGX had 774 listed companies with a combined market capitalization of S$650 billion. The revenues of SGX are mainly from the securities market (75%) and derivatives market (25%).

SGX reported a net profit of $165.8 million for the first half of its financial year 2010.  Excluding non-recurring items, net profit was 7% higher compared to 1H FY2009 ($159.2 million). In the second quarter of the financial year 2010, excluding the non-recurring items, net profit of $77.0 million was 3% higher than a year ago. Operating revenue increased 6% to $324.0 million (1H FY2009: $304.9 million).

Small-cap sell-off 
In October 2013, excessive speculation led to the sharp price fall of three mainboard stocks, Blumont Group Ltd, Asiasons Capital Ltd. and LionGold Corp. SGX and the Monetary Authority of Singapore (MAS) launched a review of activities around the three stocks, and in February 2014 jointly issued a consultation paper setting out a number of enhancements to strengthen the securities market and protect investors from speculative and market manipulative behavior. Enhancements included implementing a minimum trading price for mainboard listed issuers, requiring reporting of short positions and the creation of three independent regulatory bodies.

2018 Review of corporate governance code 
Numerous guidelines are set to be shifted to SGX Listing Rules. At least one-third of the board members are to be independent directors. The shareholding threshold for assessing director independence has been lowered to 5% from 10%. A director will no longer be independent if he or any immediate family member is a substantial shareholder with a 5% stake or more. Relationships between chairman and CEO must be disclosed if they are immediate family members. There will be a proposed 9 year limit on independent directors as a hard limit, or  the appointment of independent directors who have served more than nine years to be put to an annual vote requiring approval from majority of all shareholders and majority of non-controlling shareholders, with a transition period of three years to be provided regardless of the option adopted. Directors must be submitted for renomination and reappointment at least once every three years. If dividends are not paid, companies must state the reason.

The Corporate Governance Council of Singapore is proposing to force a "nine-year rule" that will reassess whether long-serving independent directors of listed companies will qualify as independent after being in that role for so long. The proposal was made in an effort to encourage companies to refresh and introduce more diversity into their boardrooms. The Singapore Exchange is seeking public feedback on whether it should be written into the Listing Rules, and public consultation will close on 15 March.

Proposed stock market trading link with Bursa Malaysia 
On 6 February 2018, the Singapore Exchange (SGX) and Bursa Malaysia announced a proposed stock market trading link which will be operational by end-2018. The new link will allow investors to conduct trading of shares in an efficient manner. In addition to trading, the link will cover the clearing and settlement of traded stocks, procedures required for post-trading arrangements. Before the launch of the link, cross-border supervisory and enforcement arrangements will be worked upon by the Monetary Authority of Singapore and Securities Commission Malaysia. After the results of the 2018 Malaysian general election, plans for the stock market link were put on hold.

Listing into Bloomberg Gender Equality Index 
On 21 January 2020, Singapore Exchange (SGX) was listed in the Bloomberg Gender-Equality Index (GEI) for the first time in recognition of gender equality, as well as its commitment to diversity and board representation.

Merger talks

Merger talks with ASX 
SGX was in merger talks with Australian Securities Exchange (ASX), which would have created a bourse with a market value of US$14 billion had the deal been successful.

The Australian Competition & Consumer Commission said on 15 December 2010 that it would not oppose SGXs takeover of ASX.

Criticism from Tokyo Stock Exchange 
SGX's plans to buy ASX have drawn criticism from the Tokyo Stock Exchange, which is the second largest shareholder in SGX. A representative of the TSE said SGX's bid for ASX  "would flag off a race to consolidate". TSE chief Atsushi Saito fears isolation of the Tokyo Stock Exchange as a result of the takeover.

Revision of takeover proposal 
SGX revised its initial takeover proposal in an attempt to overcome some of the opposition to the plans. This would have decreased the number of Singaporean citizens on the board of the combined company and would have given addition seats to Australians.

Rejection of merger 
However, on 8 April 2011, the Treasurer of Australia, Wayne Swan, made the decision to block the merger between the two exchanges. Upon the announcement that the federal government would block the merger, SGX retracted its bid for ASX shares and decided to seek growth opportunities elsewhere.

Cooperation and merger talks with LSE 
As of July 2012, SGX was in merger talks with the London Stock Exchange (LSE) and the two exchanges already signed a cross trading agreement. However, on 20 July, SGX said there are no plans for a takeover of or merger with LSE.

Companies listed on Singapore Exchange 

As of February 2022, there were 672 listed companies (excluding GDRs, Hedge Funds and Debt Securities) on the Singapore Exchange with a market capitalisation of SGD 899,124 million (roughly US$700 million).

Major shareholders 
The following is a listing of the shareholders of Singapore Exchange Ltd holding at least 5 percent as of 3 August 2015:

 SEL Holdings Pte Ltd – 23.66%

Note: Nominees service companies were excluded

See also 
 List of stock exchanges in the Commonwealth of Nations

References

Further reading

External links 

  Annual Report 2009 : Association of Dutch Businessmen (This info should be incorporated into the article)

 
1999 establishments in Singapore
Financial services companies established in 1999
Economy of Singapore
Stock exchanges in Singapore
Companies listed on the Singapore Exchange
Singaporean companies established in 1999
Stock exchanges in Southeast Asia
Singaporean brands
Financial regulatory authorities of Singapore